Fibertel was an Argentine Internet service provider. It worked as a stand-alone organization until 2003, when it was merged with Cablevisión, a cable television provider. Cablevisión was part of the Grupo Clarín, thus Fibertel became part of it. Fibertel has over a million clients, and it is the third ISP of the country. In 2018, Cablevisión, including Fibertel, merged with Telecom Argentina.

History 

Fibertel started working in 1997, giving service of cable modem. This gave it an edge over contemporary ISP, many of which provided Dial-up Internet access. It was bought in 2003 by Cablevisión, a cable television provider. Cablevisión would be bought later by the Grupo Clarín.

References

External links
 Official website (archived)

Internet service providers of Argentina
Argentine brands
Mass media in Argentina
Internet properties established in 1997
Clarín Group